The Silver Logie for Most Outstanding Newcomer, also known as the Graham Kennedy Award for Most Outstanding Newcomer, was an award presented annually at the Australian TV Week Logie Awards. It was created in honour of Graham Kennedy following his death in 2005. The award was first presented at the 48th Annual TV Week Logie Awards, held in 2006 when it was originally called Most Outstanding New Talent. It was given to honour an outstanding performance of a new talent on an Australian program. It may or may not be their first television appearance, however it is their first major television role. The winner and nominees of this award was chosen by television industry juries. It was last presented in 2017.

Winners and nominees

See also
George Wallace Memorial Logie for Best New Talent
Logie Award for Most Popular New Male Talent
Logie Award for Most Popular New Female Talent
Logie Award for Most Popular New Talent

References

Awards established in 2006